Shahid Ghoddoosi Metro Station is a station in line 3 of the Tehran Metro. It is located at Qasr intersection (Shariati & Shahid Beheshti Streets), in Tehran's district 7.

References

Tehran Metro stations
Railway stations opened in 2016
2016 establishments in Iran